Erik Sökjer-Petersén (4 December 1887 – 17 April 1967) was a Swedish sport shooter who competed in the 1912 Summer Olympics and in the 1920 Summer Olympics.

In 1912 he finished seventh in the individual running deer, double shots competition and eleventh in the individual running deer, single shots event. Eight years later he won the bronze medal as member of the Swedish team in the team clay pigeons competition. He also participated in the individual trap event but his result is unknown.

References

External links
profile

1887 births
1967 deaths
Swedish male sport shooters
Olympic shooters of Sweden
Shooters at the 1912 Summer Olympics
Shooters at the 1920 Summer Olympics
Olympic bronze medalists for Sweden
Trap and double trap shooters
Olympic medalists in shooting
Medalists at the 1920 Summer Olympics
19th-century Swedish people
20th-century Swedish people